Brit Fougner (born 21 February 1946) is a Norwegian organizational leader and politician for the Socialist Left Party.

From 1990 to 1994 she was the managing director of the Council for Equality (a predecessor of the Centre for Equality, which in turn was a predecessor for the Norwegian Equality and Anti-Discrimination Ombud). She was hired in Norsk Form in 1995, first as information director but then as chief executive from 2003 to 2008.

She served as a deputy representative to the Parliament of Norway from Oslo during the term 1989–1993. She was also the chairperson of Oslo Concert Hall from 1992 to 2004.

She was married to Einar Førde.

References

Norwegian women's rights activists
1946 births
Living people
Deputy members of the Storting
Women members of the Storting
Socialist Left Party (Norway) politicians
Norwegian feminists
Politicians from Oslo
Norwegian socialist feminists
20th-century Norwegian politicians
21st-century Norwegian politicians
20th-century Norwegian women politicians
21st-century Norwegian women politicians